Alexander Rocciasana (born November 11, 1989; Alessandro Ronconi) is an Italian songwriter.

His most popular songs include "La Chanson de la Primière Route", "Adolescenza", "Consumazione Obbligatoria", "Parla", "Disco" and "Campioni del Mondo".

In October 2012, it is reviewed the EP "A Volte Ritornano..." containing the 2012 version of Disco by Vice.com, and was a great trial.

Partial discography

Album
2009 – Non Voglio Restare Solo (EP)
2010 – The Womens (EP)
2012 – A Volte Ritornano... (EP)
2016 – Poesie e Canzoni (Album)
2017 – Volume 2 (La Svolta) (EP)

Singles
2013 – Consumazione Obbligatoria

References

English-language singers from Italy
1989 births
Living people
People from Carrara
Italian  male songwriters
21st-century Italian  male singers